The Weissenegg Formation is a geologic formation in Austria. It preserves fossils dating back to the Miocene period.

Fossil content 
Various fossils have been found in the formation.

Fish 

 Aetobatus arcuatus
 Araloselachus cuspidata
 Carcharias acutissima	
 Carcharhinus priscus
 Chaenogaleus affinis
 Dasyatis delfortriei
 Dasyatis rugosa
 Galeocerdo aduncus
 Ginglymostoma delfortriei
 Hemipristis serra
 Isurus hastalis
 Megalodon
 Myliobatis sp.
 Negaprion sp.
 Notidanus primigenius
 Rhinoptera schultzi
 Rhinoptera studeri
 Rhizoprionodon fischeuri

Mammals 
 Metaxytherium medium

See also 
 List of fossiliferous stratigraphic units in Austria

References 

Geologic formations of Austria
Miocene Series of Europe
Neogene Austria
Langhian
Serravallian
Sandstone formations
Shale formations
Siltstone formations
Limestone formations
Shallow marine deposits
Paleontology in Austria